Jabez Lamar Monroe Curry (June 5, 1825 – February 12, 1903) was an American Democratic politician from Alabama who served in the state legislature and US Congress. He also served as an officer of the Confederate States Army in the American Civil War. He was a slave owner and supported the Southern cause.

After the war, he became strongly interested in education of both blacks and whites, supporting increased access. Curry taught at the university level. He was also appointed as a diplomat to Spain, serving from 1885 to 1888, and again in 1902.

Biography 

Curry was born in Lincoln County, Georgia, the son of planter William and Susan Winn Curry. His father was a cousin of Mirabeau Buonaparte Lamar, the second president of the Republic of Texas. Lamar had married Tabitha Burwell Jordan, J.L.M. Curry's aunt. Curry grew up in a slaveholding family in Alabama and graduated from the University of Georgia in 1843, where he was a member of the Phi Kappa Literary Society. While studying at Harvard Law School, Curry was inspired by the lectures of Horace Mann and became an advocate of free universal education.

Curry became an attorney and held slaves. He served in the military and in public life. He served in the Mexican–American War of 1848. In this same period, he was elected to the Alabama State Legislature, serving in 1847, 1853, and 1855. He served two terms as a Democrat in the United States House of Representatives, from 1857 to 1861. After Alabama seceded with the outbreak of the American Civil War, Curry resigned from Congress and served in the Provisional Congress of the Confederate States.

He was commissioned as a lieutenant-colonel in the Confederate Army, where he served as a staff aide to General Joseph E. Johnston and General Joseph Wheeler.

After the war he studied for the ministry and became a preacher, but the focus of his work was free education in the South. He traveled and lectured in support of state normal schools, adequate rural schools, and a system of graded public schools. He was president of Howard College (now Samford University), Alabama from 1865–68. He next was a professor of history and literature at Richmond College, Virginia.

From 1881 until his death Curry was agent for the Peabody and Slater Funds to aid schools in the South. He was instrumental in the founding of both the Southern Education Board and the first normal school in Virginia, now known as Longwood University.

Curry served as envoy extraordinary and minister plenipotentiary to Spain during 1885–1888 and as ambassador extraordinary to Spain on the coming of age of King Alfonso XIII in 1902.

Curry wrote works on education, American government, and Spanish history. Curry died on February 12, 1903, and is buried in Richmond, Virginia. His wife is buried in Talladega, Alabama, where they had earlier lived. Their home, the J.L.M. Curry House, also called the Curry-Burt-Smelley House, was designated as a National Historic Landmark and has been preserved.

Legacy 
During his life, Curry was awarded the Royal Order of Charles III and several honorary degrees.

The Curry School of Education at the University of Virginia was named for him posthumously in 1905, in accordance with a stipulation in a donation given that year by John D. Rockfeller, Sr. to fund the establishment of the school. In spring 2020, the university president supported a recommendation to remove Curry's name from the school, because of his support for slavery and the Confederate cause. This reflects a shared effort on the part of the institution and the broader Charlottesville community to mitigate the stains of racism and slavery. In September the University's board of visitors voted to remove his name from the school.

As the naming subcommittee reported, Curry's legacy is worthy of careful scrutiny. His pro-slavery speeches from before the Civil War and membership in the Confederate House of Representatives demonstrate strong ties to the Southern cause. However, his later efforts to promote education for blacks during the Reconstruction era up through the end of the 19th century are reflective of more progressive ideals that were not shared by many of his contemporaries. He did promote a more vocational style of education for blacks than he would for whites. This approach was shared by Booker T. Washington of the Tuskegee Institute, who believed that blacks should be prepared for the work most would encounter in their rural communities of the time.

Curry Hall dormitory at Longwood University and the Curry Building at the University of North Carolina at Greensboro are also named for him.

Curry was honored early in the 20th century by one of Alabama's two statues in the United States Capitol's National Statuary Hall Collection. It was sculpted by Dante Sodini in 1908, the year the state donated it to the hall. In October 2009, the state replaced the statue with one of Helen Keller, activist and author.

Curry's statue was transferred to Samford University, where he had been closely involved. It was displayed in Samford's university center until the building was closed for renovation in 2018. At that point the statue was returned to the Alabama Department of Archives and History.

Works 
 Constitutional Government in Spain (1889)
 William Ewart Gladstone (1891)
 The Southern States of the American Union (1894)
 Difficulties, Complications, and Limitations Connected with the Education of the Negro (1895)
 Civil History of the Government of the Confederate States, with some Personal Reminiscences (1901)

References

External links

NSHC biography
The South in the Olden Time. Harrisburg, Pa.: Harrisburg Publishing Company, 1901.
History of the University of Georgia by Thomas Walter Reed, Thomas Walter Reed, Imprint: Athens, Georgia: University of Georgia, ca. 1949

Jabez Lamar Monroe Curry at Encyclopedia Virginia

1825 births
1903 deaths
19th-century American diplomats
19th-century American historians
19th-century American male writers
19th-century American politicians
Ambassadors of the United States to Spain
Confederate States Army officers
Democratic Party members of the United States House of Representatives from Alabama
Deputies and delegates to the Provisional Congress of the Confederate States
Harvard Law School alumni
Longwood University people
Members of the Confederate House of Representatives from Alabama
People from Lincoln County, Georgia
People of Georgia (U.S. state) in the American Civil War
Signers of the Confederate States Constitution
Signers of the Provisional Constitution of the Confederate States
University of Georgia alumni
American male non-fiction writers
Historians from Georgia (U.S. state)
American slave owners
Southern Historical Society